MDHP may refer to:

National Revival Movement Party, a political party in Azerbaijan
The Million Dollar Homepage